"Ho Jamalo" is a Sindhi-language folk song and associated dance in the Sindhi culture.  The performance is about the local folk hero Jamalo Khoso Baloch, of middle 19th century. In modern times, the song has been repopularized since 1947, and recorded by Abida Parveen, in Sindhi, and Shazia Khushk, in the Urdu language.

A Punjabi rendition of the song was performed by Ali Sethi and Humaira Arshad in season 11 of Coke Studio Pakistan.

History of Ho Jamalo
There are several versions of the history of Ho Jamalo. One of the most accepted stories goes that a fierce battle was fought somewhere in upper Sindh and the dwellers of the area were facing extreme challenges against the invaders. At this juncture, a man named Jamal, who was very brave and courageous, led a small army to fight against the invaders. There was a fierce and bloody encounter and he emerged victorious. When he came home within sight of their settlement, the women of the area came out singing: ‘Ho Jamalo, khati aayo khair saan.’ Translation: Oh great Jamalo, you have come victorious without facing any loss.

See also 
 Sindhi culture

References 

https://www.dawn.com/news/1433223

Sindhi dance
Sindhi music
Sindhi folklore
British East India Company
Sindhi-language songs
Ali Sethi songs